David Lowe (born 28 February 1960) is a retired butterfly and freestyle swimmer.

Swimming career
Born in Southern Rhodesia (now Zimbabwe),  he represented the United Kingdom at two consecutive Summer Olympics, starting in 1980. At his Olympic debut in Moscow he won the bronze medal in the men's 4×100-meters medley relay, alongside teammates Gary Abraham, Duncan Goodhew, and Martin Smith, clocking 3:47.71.

He represented England and won three silver medals in the 4 x 100 and 4 x 200 metres freestyle relay and the 4 x 100 metres medley relay, at the 1982 Commonwealth Games in Brisbane, Queensland, Australia.

He won the 1984 ASA National Championship 50 metres freestyle title and three titles in the 100 metres freestyle (1982-1984). He also won the 1981 100 metres butterfly title.

See also
 List of Olympic medalists in swimming (men)

References

External links 
 
 
 

1960 births
Living people
Commonwealth Games silver medallists for England
English male swimmers
Male butterfly swimmers
English male freestyle swimmers
Olympic bronze medalists in swimming
Olympic swimmers of Great Britain
Sportspeople from Bulawayo
Swimmers at the 1980 Summer Olympics
Swimmers at the 1984 Summer Olympics
Alumni of Allan Wilson High School
University of Houston alumni
Medalists at the 1980 Summer Olympics
Olympic bronze medallists for Great Britain
Commonwealth Games medallists in swimming
Swimmers at the 1982 Commonwealth Games
Medallists at the 1982 Commonwealth Games